General elections were held in Madagascar on 20 December 2013, following a first round of presidential elections on 25 October. The presidential elections in December were a runoff between Jean Louis Robinson and Hery Rajaonarimampianina, the top two candidates to emerge from the first round of voting in October. The official results of the second round were announced on 7 January 2014 with Rajaonarimampianina proclaimed the victor with nearly 54% of the vote.

The last elected president, Marc Ravalomanana, was unconstitutionally removed from power by mass protests led by Mayor of Antananarivo Andry Rajoelina in early 2009. Rajoelina dissolved the Senate and National Assembly and took power as the president of the High Transitional Authority (HAT) he created to govern the country in the lead up to elections, which he promised to hold within 18 months. The HAT repeatedly delayed the parliamentary and presidential elections, which were scheduled separately for various dates before finally being merged in May 2011 and postponed to September 2011, May 2012, November 2012, May 2013, July 2013 and August 2013. The 2010 constitutional referendum introduced a new constitution that barred candidates who had not lived in Madagascar for the previous six months, effectively excluding opposition leaders living in exile, including Ravalomanana, who had resided in South Africa since his ouster.

The international community was actively involved in negotiating an end to the political impasse in Madagascar and maintained legitimate and transparent elections as a precondition to international recognition of Madagascar's head of state. In 2012 the African Union demanded that both top candidates - Rajoelina and Ravalomanana - withdraw their candidature. Ravalomanana accepted in December 2012, and Rajoelina followed suit in February 2013. Shortly afterward, Lalao Ravalomanana, wife of the former president, submitted her candidature, causing Rajoelina to add his name to the list of candidates just after the deadline; former president Didier Ratsiraka also submitted his candidature despite having returned from exile in France too recently to meet the six-month requirement. This prompted the international community to withdraw funding for the election then scheduled for May 2013, leading to further delays. All three candidates were removed from the approved list by an electoral court in August 2013, and the international community recommitted to providing financial support for the 2013 elections.

Presidential elections
After becoming transitional President in March 2009, Andry Rajoelina announced that, within 24 months, there would be a new constitution and elections. Rajoelina was effectively handed the presidency on 18 March 2009, when the military handed over the executive power that was given to it by President Marc Ravalomanana upon his resignation. Rajoelina, as president of the High Transitional Authority which he had created weeks before Ravalomanana's resignation, announced he would serve as head of state until the next election. He became the youngest head of state in the country's history at 34 years of age.

On 13 May 2009 it was reported that Rajoelina had stated he did not want to run in the presidential election and that he only wanted to lay the groundwork. According to Rajoelina, he was prepared to accept a proposal from United Nations mediators that no former heads of state run in the election, but only if the other former heads of state also accepted the proposal. On 14 May, Ravalomanana ridiculed the proposal and said that "anyone who is legally eligible to run for president should be allowed to do so". On 23 May 2009 an agreement was reached that all former presidents would be allowed to stand in the election.

Rajoelina announced on 12 July 2009 that the election would be held by the end of 2009 to accommodate the demands of international investors, including the EU. This did not take place, however. In May 2010, the elections were set for 26 November 2010 and Rajoelina announced that he would not be a candidate, though he latter suggested that he was still considering running.

A constitutional referendum, originally scheduled for September 2009, was held in Madagascar on 17 November 2010, in which voters approved a proposal for the state's fourth Constitution. The new constitution contains a clause that requires presidential candidates to have lived in Madagascar for at least six months prior to the elections, effectively barring Ravalomanana, who has been living in exile and faces life in prison upon returning to Madagascar after being convicted in absentia for the deaths of protestors during the coup, from running in the next election. Ravalomanana and Rajoelina engaged in negotiations to allow for Ravalomanana's return to the country, but have failed to come to an agreement.

In April 2012 an amnesty law was passed, but it prevents the return of former president Marc Ravalomanana despite the South African Development Community's attempts at brokering a reconciliation agreement signed by all parties that would allow him to return. In December 2012, Ravalomanana agreed to withdraw his candidacy in compliance with the international community's roadmap to legitimate elections in Madagascar; Rajoelina followed suit two months later. However, when Ravalomanana's wife Lalao submitted her candidacy despite not having met the six-month residency requirement prior to doing so, Rajoelina likewise submitted his candidature after the deadline had officially closed. Former president Didier Ratsiraka also submitted his candidacy, despite also failing to meet the six-month residency requirement. Donors consequently pulled funding for the election, leading it to be postponed twice in 2013. In May 2013, the first round of the presidential elections was scheduled for 23 August 2013 alongside Parliamentary elections, with a second round of presidential elections in October if a runoff were needed. In September 2013, the first round of presidential elections was scheduled for 25 October, with a presidential run-off, if necessary, and parliamentary elections to be held on 20 December 2013.

In August 2013, the special electoral court decided to invalidate the candidacy of Rajoelina, Ravalomanana and Ratsiraka, thereby fulfilling a key criteria for legitimacy set forth by the international community. In August 2013, Foreign Minister Pierrot Rajaonarivelo and Finance Minister Hery Rajaonarimampianina resigned in order to run for the presidency.

Thirty-three presidential candidates were approved to appear on the final ballot used in the first round of voting held in October. None of the candidates won more than fifty percent of the vote, requiring a runoff in December to elect a new president. The candidate with the most votes (21.1%), Jean Louis Robinson, was the declared candidate of former president Ravalomanana. The second place candidate (15.93%), Hery Rajaonarimampianina, was named by Rajoelina as his preferred candidate.

In the second round of voting, held on 20 December, Rajaonarimampianina was elected president with 54% of the votes over Robinson won 46% of the vote, mainly in the densely populated central highlands around the capital of Antananarivo. The election was declared peaceful and legitimate by international observers, although both candidates accused the other of fraud.  The results were announced by the electoral commission on 7 January 2014; the commission stated that the results would be officially confirmed on 18 February. Robinson conceded defeat in late January, and Rajaonarimampianina was sworn in as president in an inauguration attended by foreign dignitaries, including the French Ambassador and American Attache.

Parliamentary elections
On 19 March 2009, Rajoelina dissolved the National Assembly of Madagascar and the Senate of Madagascar. Parliamentary elections were planned for 2011, after being postponed from 20 March 2010 and then 30 September 2010. Parliamentary and presidential elections were previously scheduled separately for various dates before finally being merged in May 2011 and postponed to September 2011, May 2012, November 2012, May 2013, July 2013 and August 2013.

Rajoelina announced on 16 December 2009 that parliamentary elections would be held in March 2010. In May, it was announced they would be held on 30 September 2010. On 14 August 2010, they were again postponed to 16 March 2011. Another postponement was announced in January 2011, with no new date specified. Parliamentary elections were held on 20 December 2013. It was the first time parliamentary elections were held concurrently with the presidential election.

Presidential candidates
Thirty-three approved contenders ran in the 2013 presidential election. In August 2013, the three top candidates were barred from running by a Madagascar legal body charged with election oversight. These included Rajoelina, barred for not submitting his candidacy by the deadline; Lalao Ravalomanana, barred for not having lived in Madagascar for 6 months before the poll; and Didier Ratsiraka, barred for filing paperwork for the candidacy only 2 days after returning from exile. Ravalomanana publicly endorsed medical doctor and politician Jean Louis Robinson from Antananarivo. On 24 September 2013, the official starting date of the campaign, online news magazine Afrik.com identified the top candidates as Jean-Louis Robinson, Hery Rajaonarimampianina (endorsed by Andry Rajoelina), Hajo Andrianainarivelo, Camille Vital, Pierrot Rajaonarivelo and Saraha Georget Rabeharisoa.

Results

President
Jean Louis Robinson and Hery Rajaonarimampianina emerged as the two candidates with the most votes in the first round held in October 2013, receiving 21% and 16% of the vote respectively. Election results for the second round, held in December 2013, were announced on 7 January. Rajaonarimampianina won with 53.5% of the vote while Robinson had 46.5%.

National Assembly

References

External links
Dr Jean Louis Robinson (Malagasy only)
Saraha Georget Rabeharisoa (Malagasy and French only)

Presidential elections in Madagascar
Madagascar
General
Elections in Madagascar
Madagascar
Election and referendum articles with incomplete results